Caloundra West is a mixed-use suburb of Caloundra in the Sunshine Coast Region, Queensland, Australia. In the  Caloundra West had a population of 6,297 people.

Geography 
Caloundra West is within the Caloundra urban centre directly west of the Caloundra central business district.

The north of the suburb has some residential housing, an industrial estate, and undeveloped bushland. Caloundra Airport occupies the centre of the suburb. The west of the suburb is residential housing, while the south of the suburb is undeveloped marshland.

Caloundra Road runs through from west to east.

History
The suburb was named and bounded on 18 June 1988. The name Caloundra is from the Kabi language Cullowundoor with Kal Owen meaning beech tree (Gmelina Leichhardtii) and Dha meaning place.

Unity College opened on 24 January 2006.

In the  Caloundra West had a population of 6,297 people.

Education 
Unity College is a Catholic primary and secondary (Prep to Year 12) school for boys and girls at 47 Lomond Crescent, Bellvista Estate. In 2018, the school had an enrolment of 1,405 students with 111 teachers (100 full-time equivalent) and 62 non-teaching staff (50 full-time equivalent).

There are no government schools in Caloundra West. The nearest government primary schools are Talara Primary College in Currimundi to the north, Meridan State College in Meridan Plains to the north-west, Golden Beach State School in neighbouring Golden Beach to south-east, and Baringa State Primary School in neighbouring Baringa to the west. The nearest secondary schools are Meridan State College in Meridan Plains to the north-west and Caloundra State High School in Caloundra to the north-east.

Facilities 
Caloundra Airport is on Pathfinder Drive.

Caloundra Fire Station is at 18 Industrial Avenue.

Amenities 
The Sunshine Coast Regional Council operates a mobile library service which visits Lomond Crescent in the Bellvista Estate.

There are a number of parks in the suburb, including:

 Beau Vista Park
 Bellvista Neighbourhood Park
 Bellvista Western/East Pathway
 Bimberi Circuit Park
 Cougal Circuit Park
 Dumbarton Drive Park
 Enterprise Road Reserve
 Exeter Way Park
 Glennie Close Park
 Grampion Drive Bushland Park
 Grampion Drive Pump Station
 Heritage Park
 Huntley Place Walkway
 Isabel Jordan Bushland Reserve
 Newing Way Reserve
 Northbrook Street Park
 Queen Street Bushland Park
 Rotary Park
 Shannon Crescent Park
 Springbrook Street Park
 Sydal Street Park
 Toolona Place Walkway
 Tourist Information Park
 Widgee Place Walkway

Attractions 
The Queensland Air Museum is at Caloundra Airport on Pathfinder Drive.

References

Suburbs of the Sunshine Coast Region
Caloundra